Bump Ahead is the third studio album by the American hard rock band Mr. Big. It was released in 1993 by Atlantic.

Track listing

Personnel
Mr. Big
 Eric Martin – lead vocals
 Paul Gilbert – guitar, backing vocals
 Billy Sheehan – bass guitar, backing vocals
 Pat Torpey – drums, backing vocals

Additional musicians
 Little John Chrisley - harmonica on "Price You Gotta Pay"

Production
 Kevin Elson - producer, engineer, mixing, mastering
 Andy Udoff, Stephen Hart, Dick Kaneshiro, Michael Semanick - assistant engineers
 Tom Size - mixing
 Bob Ludwig - mastering
 Melanie Nissen - art direction
 Reisig and Taylor - photography, images

Charts

Album

Singles

Certifications

References

External links
Heavy Harmonies page

Mr. Big (American band) albums
1993 albums
Atlantic Records albums
Albums produced by Kevin Elson